Ebian Yi Autonomous County is a county of Sichuan Province, China. It is under the administration of Leshan city.

Climate

References

 
County-level divisions of Sichuan
Yi autonomous counties
Leshan